Spirits Having Flown Tour (also known as the Spirits Tour and the North American Tour) is the eighth concert tour by the Bee Gees in support of their fifteenth studio album Spirits Having Flown (1979). The tour began on 28 June 1979 in Fort Worth, Texas reaching a total of 38 cities before coming to a close on 6 October 1979 in Miami, Florida. It was their most lavish and successful tour during the height of their popularity following two straight number-one albums and six number-one singles and grossed over $10 million from 49 shows, as reported by Billboard by the end of its run. The tour was organized and promoted by Jerry Weintraub and Concerts West.

Background 
After the release of the Saturday Night Fever soundtrack, The Bee Gees were unable to tour due to their commitment to the Sgt. Pepper's Lonely Hearts Club Band movie. Then from March to November 1978, they spent much of their time in the studio recording Spirits Having Flown, the follow-up album to Saturday Night Fever.

Prior to the kickoff of the tour, The Bee Gees popularity grew even further following Saturday Night Fever, when they were the headline act on the Music for UNICEF Concert in January. Then they won four Grammy awards in February for Fever and by June, they pulled off a feat only matched by The Beatles with six consecutive US number-one singles, when "Love You Inside Out" topped the charts in June, setting the stage for the hottest summer tour since The Beatles in 1964.

In addition, the Bee Gees' brother Andy Gibb took part in the tour, making a guest vocal appearance; he, too, was at the height of his popularity, having notched three US Billboard number-one singles and appearing at the Music for UNICEF Concert.

Considering the group's popularity was at an all-time high, stringent security precautions were taken, though The Bee Gees themselves set up base in only five cities. They would fly to the next venue and return to their home base immediately following the show. They leased a custom 55-seat Boeing 720 jet (previously used by Led Zeppelin) at a cost of over one million dollars with a specially designed logo on the exterior of the plane. The Bee Gees were accompanied on the tour by a film crew capturing highlights of the shows, for use in an NBC-TV special which aired in November, hosted by David Frost.

The Bee Gees were joined on stage with their usual band featuring Alan Kendall on guitar, Blue Weaver on keyboards and Dennis Bryon on drums, as well as Boonero Horns, a 6-piece brass section and Sweet Inspirations, which provided backing vocals.

The show 
Given that this was the most ambitious tour The Bee Gees ever embarked on, there was a lot of preparation that went into the tour, from an extensive rehearsal schedule (in which The Bee Gees missed that year's Billboard music awards, where they won an astonishing 11 awards), staging and special effects, merchandising and tight security. The tour consisted of a 41-date schedule starting in Fort Worth, Texas and ending in their hometown of Miami, Florida. The 3 Gibb brothers were identically dressed in incredibly skin-tight, white satin trousers and dazzling white spangled jackets throughout the tour. During the Houston show on June 30, a bearded John Travolta joined the Bee Gees on stage during "You Should Be Dancing" to reprise some of his footwork from Saturday Night Fever. Travolta was in Houston shooting the film Urban Cowboy. Besides the surprise appearance by Travolta at the Houston concert, many celebrities were in attendance at many of the concerts. Among the 60,000 fans at L.A.'s Dodger Stadium were Cary Grant, Barbra Streisand, Rod Stewart, Olivia Newton-John, Karen Carpenter, Jack Nicholson and Harry Wayne Casey of KC & The Sunshine Band. Prior to their September 24 concert in Landover, the Bee Gees were invited to the White House where President Carter congratulated them for their efforts with UNICEF.

A scheduled concert in Kansas City, Missouri had to be cancelled due to severe damage to the roof of Kemper Arena during a violent storm on June 4.

Tour band

Barry Gibb – Lead vocal, guitar
Robin Gibb – Vocals
Maurice Gibb – Backing vocal, guitar
Andy Gibb – Vocals
Alan Kendall – Guitar
Joey Murcia – Guitar
Blue Weaver – keyboards
George Bitzer – Keyboards
Harold Cowart – Bass 
Dennis Bryon – Drums
Joe Lala – Percussion
Boneroo Horns – Trumpets, Trombones, Saxophones
Sweet Inspirations – Backing vocalists

Set list 
"Tragedy"
"Edge of the Universe"
"Night Fever"
"Love So Right"
"Stayin' Alive"
"New York Mining Disaster 1941"
"Run to Me"
"Too Much Heaven"
"Holiday"
"I Can't See Nobody"
"Lonely Days"
"I Started a Joke"
"Massachusetts"
"How Can You Mend a Broken Heart"
"Nights on Broadway"
"To Love Somebody"
"Words"
"Wind of Change"
"How Deep Is Your Love"
"Jive Talkin'"

Encore
"You Should Be Dancing"

Tour dates

Cancellations and rescheduled shows

References 

1979 concert tours
Bee Gees concert tours